Inter Leipzig is a German association football club located in Leipzig, Saxony. Their first team competes in the NOFV-Oberliga, the fifth tier of German football.

History
According to the Inter Leipzig mission statement, the club claims to become the "international and open-minded" Leipzig football team. The former mayor of Leipzig, Wolfgang Tiefensee, serves on the economic board.

In order to participate in the 2014–15 Sachsenliga season, Inter Leipzig merged with SV See 90 from the Upper Lusatian town Niesky. Previously, the club had unsuccessfully attempted to merge with TuS Leutzsch of Leipzig.

The first official match was played in the opening round of the Saxony Cup 2014–15 against SV Lipsia Eutritzsch, which ended in a 2–0 win for Inter Leipzig. On the last day of the 2014–15 season, the team was promoted to the NOFV-Oberliga Süd after a 7–0 win against Heidenauer SV. In July 2015 the team introduced a new team logo. The unicorn was replaced by a lion, which is the heraldic animal of the city of Leipzig.

Logo

Past seasons

Current squad

International players
Nerijus Astrauskas appeared in two games for Lithuania.

References

External links
 Official website 

Leipzig Inter
Football clubs in Saxony
Inter
Association football clubs established in 2014
2014 establishments in Germany